thumb|225px|Crocodile Hunting
Pasqual Pere Moles i Coronas, also known as Pedro Pascual Moles (23 October 1741, Valencia - 26 October 1797, Barcelona) was a Spanish engraver who served as the first Director of the Escola de la Llotja; a position he held until his death.

Life and works 
His father, Salvador, was a bookseller. He decided to remain there. His contributions led to his being named a Supernumerary Academic at the Real Academia de Bellas Artes de San Fernando. Thanks to a pension granted by the Junta, he was able to improve his skills by studying in Paris with Nicolas-Gabriel Dupuis and Charles-Nicolas Cochin, from 1766 to 1774. 

As Director, he was an advocate of the academic approach of Anton Raphael Mengs, and was opposed to the traditional method of teaching art as a profession. In addition to organizing the school, he helped create the school's museum, which became the first art museum in Catalonia; currently located at the Reial Acadèmia Catalana de Belles Arts de Sant Jordi. During these years, he continued to work as an engraver; becoming an expert in chalcography. After 1779, he devoted much time and effort contributing to illustrations for the  Memorias históricas by Antonio de Capmany.  

After a brief period of mental instability, which received only passing notice from his associates, he committed suicide by throwing himself from one of the school's windows.

References

Bibliografía 
 Rosa Maria Subirana i Rebull, Pasqual Pere Moles i Corones. València 1741 - Barcelona 1797. Barcelona: Biblioteca de Catalunya, 1990

External links 

1741 births
1797 deaths
Spanish engravers
Spanish art directors
Spanish illustrators
People from Valencia